Dorstenia flagellifera is a plant species in the family Moraceae which is native to Haiti.

References

flagellifera
Plants described in 1929
Flora of Haiti
Flora without expected TNC conservation status